Auguste Digot (28 August 1815, Nancy – 29 May 1864, idem, aged 48) was a 19th-century French historian whose work was dedicated to the history of Lorraine.

Works 
A lawyer and member of the Académie de Stanislas, Digot wrote several articles and books:

1847: Histoire de Neufchâteau, (Reprint Ed. Lorisse, déc. 2004)  120 pages 
1856: Histoire de la Lorraine, in 6 volumes (more than 400 pages each) published by Vagner in Nancy - Reprint Ed. Lacour-Ollé, 2002 - 
1860: Notice biographique et littéraire sur Dom Augustin Calmet
1863: Histoire du royaume d'Austrasie in 4 volumes (Vagner, Nancy)
1864: Mémoire sur les décorations des chapitres de Lorraine,Lucien Wiener éditeur, Nancy, 41 p. + 4 pl.

Sources 
 R. Limouzin-Lamothe, "Digot (Auguste)" in Dictionnaire de biographie française, vol. 11, Paris, 1967

External links 
 Auguste Digot on data.bnf.fr
 Auguste Digot

19th-century French historians
19th-century French lawyers
1815 births
Writers from Nancy, France
1864 deaths